Annie Thayyil (10 November 1918 – 21 October 1993), was an Indian novelist, journalist, translator and biographer of Malayalam language and a member of the Cochin Legislative Council between 1945 and 1948. Her oeuvre comprises 78 books covering the genres of novel, biography, politics, travelogue and biblical literature. She was the secretary of the Sahitya Parishad and a member of the executive council of the Kerala Sahitya Akademi.

Biography 

Annie Thayyil, née Annie, was born on 10 November 1918 at Chengaloor in Pudukkad, in Thrissur district of the south Indian state of Kerala to Maliekkal Joseph and Mary. She completed her schooling from Sacred Heart Convent and St Joseph's Girls High School, Karukutty and Sacred Heart Convent Girls High School, Thrissur before passing the intermediate course examination from Holy Cross College, Tiruchirapalli. Returning to Kerala, she graduated in arts from Maharaja's College, Ernakulam and started her career by joining the Travancore State Service but quit the job in 1945 to successfully contest the polls to the Cochin Legislative Council; she won the seat again in the 1948 elections. She continued her political career during which she unsuccessfully contested three more elections, the 1964 election to the Rajya Sabha as an Indian National Congress candidate and the 1967 and 1970 elections to the Lok Sabha as an independent candidate supported by the Communist Party of India (Marxist). She also participated in the Vimochana Samaram of 1958–59 which led to the dismissal of the First E. M. S. Namboodiripad ministry. While pursuing a political career, she continued her studies to graduate in law and started practicing as a lawyer. In between, she ran a printing business in Kochi under the name Scholar Press, served as the secretary of Samastha Kerala Sahitya Parishad in 1960; edited two magazines, Vanitha and Prajamithram; sat in the National Commission for Minorities during 1984–85; and served as a member of the Central Social Welfare Board, Catholic Congress and the executive council of Kerala Sahitya Akademi.

Thayyil wrote 78 books covering the genres of novel, biography, politics, travelogue and biblical literature, of which Molente Mon Ninte (Daughter is mine, Son is yours), which criticised the orthodox views prevalent among the Catholics, became a subject of controversy. She translated a number of classics of world literature such as War and Peace, Anna Karenina, The Count of Monte Cristo, Tess of the d'Urbervilles and The Holy Sinner to publish them as abridged versions, wrote the biographies of Lal Bahadur Shastri, Indira Gandhi and John F. Kennedy and published a number of travelogues based on her travels to Europe in 1957 and to Israel in 1971. She published a political commentary, Hungariyil Enthundaayi? (What Happened in Hungary?) and her work, Christhu Marcha Divasam (The Day Christ Died), is a work on the life of Jesus Christ, based on Biblical script. Edangazhiyile kurisu was the title of her autobiography.

Annie Thayyil, married to Kurien Thayyil, died on 21 October 1993, at the age of 74. The Directorate of Women and Child Development of the Government of Kerala have instituted Vanita Ratnam Awards, eponymous awards honouring Annie Thayyil, along with other notable Indian women such as Akkamma Cherian, Captain Lakshmi, Kamala Surayya, Rani Lakshmi Bai, Fathima Beevi, Mrinalini Sarabhai, Mary Poonen Lukose, A. V. Kuttimalu Amma, Sukumari and Annie Mascarene. The annual award recognizes excellence of women in various fields.

Selected bibliography

Biographies

Translations

Memoirs

See also 

 List of Malayalam-language authors by category
 List of Malayalam-language authors
 Vanita Ratnam Award

References

Further reading

External links 
 
 

Writers from Kerala
Malayalam-language writers
20th-century Indian journalists
1918 births
1993 deaths
20th-century Indian novelists
People from Thrissur
Women writers from Kerala
20th-century Indian biographers
Malayali people
20th-century Indian politicians
Indian National Congress politicians from Kerala
Maharaja's College, Ernakulam alumni
Women biographers